Venceslau Brás Pereira Gomes (26 February 1868 – 15 May 1966) was a Brazilian politician who served as ninth president of Brazil between 1914 and 1918, during the First Brazilian Republic.  Brás was born in Brasópolis (formerly São Caetano da Vargem Grande), Minas Gerais State. He became governor of that state in 1909, and in 1910 he was elected vice-president under Hermes Rodrigues da Fonseca. As the sixth vice president of Brazil, he also served as the President of the Senate. He was elected president in 1914 and served until 1918. His government declared war on the Central Powers in October 1917 during World War I. He was the longest-lived Brazilian president, reaching 98 years of age.

Spelling of name
Throughout his life Brás spelled his name Wenceslau Braz, although there exist postage stamps with the spelling Wenceslao as well. The 1943 reform of Portuguese orthography stipulates that the names of deceased persons must be spelled according to standard Portuguese spelling rules. All Portuguese-language texts about Brás published after 1966 must therefore spell his name Venceslau Brás.

Legacy
Presidente Venceslau, a municipality in the state of São Paulo

See also
Brazil during World War I

References

External links
 Rafael Pinheiro de Araujo: Brás, Venceslau, in: 1914-1918-online. International Encyclopedia of the First World War.

1868 births
1966 deaths
Presidents of Brazil
Vice presidents of Brazil
Presidents of the Federal Senate (Brazil)
University of São Paulo alumni
Mayors of Belo Horizonte
Governors of Minas Gerais

Republican Party of Minas Gerais politicians
Coffee with milk politics politicians
Candidates for Vice President of Brazil